Brandon Jenkins (born February 9, 1990) is a former American football linebacker. He played college football for Florida State University as a defensive end. The Washington Redskins selected him in the fifth round of the 2013 NFL Draft.

High school career
Jenkins attended the Florida State University School. Jenkins carried a four-star rating and was considered the No. 13 weakside defensive end in the nation by Rivals.com as a senior.

College career
As a true freshman Jenkins played in 12 of 13 games after enrolling in January 2009. He had 12 total tackles and three tackles for loss, including one in the Seminoles' Gator Bowl victory over West Virginia. 

Jenkins was selected as the most improved defensive lineman at the end of spring practice after establishing himself as the starter at right end.

As a true sophomore in 2010 Jenkins recorded 62 tackles, 13.5 sacks, and 21.5 tackles for loss and was named Team MVP, 1st team All ACC, and 2nd team All America according to Rivals.com and Scout.com. He had a career-high nine tackle performance, including 3.5 for loss and two sacks against Boston College. NFLdraftscout.com said Jenkins was considered one of the best defensive ends in the country and future high NFL Draft pick Until he got hurt.

Professional career
Jenkins was selected by the Washington Redskins in the fifth round, with the 162nd overall pick, of the 2013 NFL Draft. He signed a four-year contract on May, 2013 that counted roughly $449,125 against the Redskins 2013 salary cap number.

On July 27, 2014, the Redskins waived Jenkins.

References

External links
Florida State Seminoles bio
Washington Redskins bio 

1990 births
Living people
American football defensive ends
Florida State Seminoles football players
Players of American football from Tallahassee, Florida
Washington Redskins players